Swanner Field at Geo Surfaces Park is a softball venue in Thibodaux, Louisiana, United States. It is home to the Nicholls Colonels softball team of the NCAA Division I Southland Conference. The venue has a capacity of 500.

History
The park opened in 1981 was formerly named Colonels Softball Diamond and Colonels Softball Complex. Prior to the 2018 season, the park underwent major renovations. It included a new synthetic turf infield by Geo Surfaces, new lights and renovated dugouts and seating. The renovations were funded by donations from Neal Swanner and the Norman Swanner Foundation. In honor of those donations, the playing surface was named Swanner Field.

Tournaments
In addition to regular season play, the softball complex was the site of the 1996 Southland Conference softball tournament.

Gallery

See also 
 Nicholls Colonels softball
 Nicholls Colonels

References

External links
 Nicholls Colonels softball website

College softball venues in the United States
Nicholls Colonels softball venues
Softball venues in Louisiana
Sports venues in Thibodaux, Louisiana
Sports venues in Louisiana
Buildings and structures in Lafourche Parish, Louisiana
Sports venues completed in 1981
1981 establishments in Louisiana